Ivana Krivokapić (born 15 June 1995) is a Montenegrin football forward currently playing for ŽFK Ekonomist.

External links 
 

1995 births
Living people
Montenegrin women's footballers
Women's association football forwards
Montenegro women's international footballers
ŽFK Ekonomist players